Manuel de Brito Filho, better known as Obina (born January 31, 1983), is a former Brazilian football striker.

Career

Vitória
Obina caught attention in 2004 when he made a solid season, despite the relegation of his club, Vitória. He scored 24 goals that season, 19 in the Brazilian Série A, being the top scorer of the team along with Edílson. At the end of that year he has been transferred to Al-Ittihad.

Flamengo
Flamengo's supporters like to refer to him as the Brazilian Samuel Eto'o (they usually chant ôôôô... Obina é melhor que o Eto'o, "Obina is better than Eto'o"), a joke-reference to the Cameroonian and former Chelsea FC player. Obina was fundamental in helping Flamengo win the 2006 Brazilian Cup. He has often been compared with Fio Maravilha for his folkloric charm. Kléber Leite, Flamengo's Director of Football, once referred to him as being "culturally naive."

During Flamengo's Taça Guanabara semi-final match against Vasco da Gama on February 25, 2007, Obina injured his left knee's anterior cruciate ligament after scoring in the second minute of the match. Flamengo's doctors estimated that he will be out of action for six months.

Just a few games after his awaited return, Obina was suspended for 120 days after hitting Internacional's player Índio with his elbow during Flamengo's match against that team on September 8, 2007.

In the two final games of the 2008 Campeonato Carioca, Obina scored three goals against Botafogo and led Flamengo to win its 30th championship.

Palmeiras
Obina was loaned to Palmeiras on May 25, 2009 until the end of the 2009 season. He debuted for Palmeiras on May 29, 2009 in a Copa Libertadores game against Nacional, scoring his first goal for the club on May 31, 2009, in a Série A game against Barueri.

Obina scored his first hat-trick for Palmeiras on July 26, 2009 against rivals Corinthians, his club won 3-0.

On November 18, 2009 Obina was involved in some trouble with his teammate Maurício, both argued and tried to hit each other after the incident. Both were resigned from the club with two matches left to play in the season.

Return to Palmeiras

In July 2012 Obina returned to Palmeiras for a six-month loan in which the São Paulo club shelled out $300 thousand ( R $626,000 ).

On July 22, 2012, shook the Nautical networks in victory by 3-0, this being his first goal after the return to Palmeiras . His poor performance, along with the entire team, which culminated with Palmeiras relegation to Serie B in 2013 led to the board of directors desist to renew with the player, following the Palestra Italia only until December, when it closes your loan agreement. On November 29, 2012, along with four other companions, was officially dismissed from the club.

Atlético Mineiro
After a very brief stay in Flamengo, for merely two weeks (the first two of 2010), Obina signed a three years contract with Atlético Mineiro prior to their first official game of the season, against América Mineiro, on January 24, 2010. The contract grants Atlético Mineiro 50% of the rights over Obina, and it cost the club approximately 700,000 euros.

China

On January 21, 2011, the Atletico Mineiro announced through its official website that the group of investors who held the pass Obina, had negotiated the player with the Chinese football. Atletico received only, according to the contract, the amount on the window rate. [9 ] Obina was sold to Shandong Luneng, current Chinese champion.

América Mineiro
Hit in January 2014 to its arrival to America Mineiro . [ 15 ] He scored twice against his former club Atletico Mineiro, but the rabbit ended up losing the game by turning 3 to 2. [ 16 ] Before Vasco da Gama, Obina scored the goal that secured the tie for América Mineiro in a match valid for the Brazilian Championship . [17 ] Before his former club Bahia, scored a penalty goal that opened the scoring for the Coelho, but the team eventually lost the match 2-1.

Bahia

Hit in January 2013, was loaned to Bahia until December 2013. [ 14] Opened on March 17, 2013, against Vitória da Conquista, match that ended in a draw 1 to 1. He scored his first goal in the club's match against Juazeirense on March 24, 2013.

Career statistics
(Correct )

according to combined sources on the Flamengo official website and Flaestatística.

Honours
Vitória
Bahia State Championship: 2004(7 goals)

Flamengo
Copa do Brasil: 2006
Taça Guanabara: 2007, 2008
Taça Rio: 2009
Rio de Janeiro State League: 2007, 2008, 2009
Campeonato Brasileiro: 2009

Atlético Mineiro
Minas Gerais State League: 2010

References

External links
  
 
 Obina at Guardian Stats Centre

 soccerterminal 
 Manuel de Brito Filho at Flapédia 

1983 births
Living people
Brazilian footballers
Brazilian expatriate footballers
Expatriate footballers in Saudi Arabia
Expatriate footballers in China
Esporte Clube Vitória players
Fluminense de Feira Futebol Clube players
Ittihad FC players
CR Flamengo footballers
Sociedade Esportiva Palmeiras players
Clube Atlético Mineiro players
Esporte Clube Bahia players
Shandong Taishan F.C. players
Chinese Super League players
Brazilian expatriate sportspeople in China
América Futebol Clube (MG) players
Campeonato Brasileiro Série A players
Campeonato Brasileiro Série B players
Association football forwards
Brazilian people of indigenous peoples descent
J1 League players
J2 League players
Matsumoto Yamaga FC players
Expatriate footballers in Japan
Saudi Professional League players